Central European Gas Hub AG (CEGH, formerly known as Gas Hub Baumgarten) is a natural gas company based in Vienna, Austria. It was founded in 2005 as a subsidiary of OMV Gas & Power GmbH. In December 2009, CEGH, together with Wiener Börse AG, opened the CEGH Gas Exchange Spot Market. The Futures market followed in December 2010.  CEGH is owned by  OMV Gas & Power GmbH (65%), Wiener Börse AG (Vienna Stock Exchange) 20% and the Slovak gas transmission system operator eustream a.s. (15%).

Central European Gas Hub provides a gas trading platform in Austria for international gas trading companies. Since January 2013 CEGH is the operator of the VTP (Virtual Trading Point) in Austria (market area east).

References

External links

The importance of gas trading hubs for Slovakia Peter Ševce | 24.07.2008
The Shadowy Side of Gazprom’s Expanding Central European Gas Hub. Publication: Eurasia Daily Monitor Volume: 5 Issue: 217. November 12, 2008

Oil and gas companies of Austria
Natural gas trading hubs
Companies based in Vienna